The 2008–09 Iranian Futsal 1st Division will be divided into two phases.

The league will also be composed of 18 teams divided into two divisions of 9 teams each, whose teams will be divided geographically. Teams will play only other teams in their own division, once at home and once away for a total of 18 matches each.

Teams

Group A

Group B

Play Off 
First leg to be played April 09, 2009; return leg to be played April 16, 2009

 Shahr Aftab Promoted to the Super League.

First leg

Return leg

First leg to be played April 09, 2009; return leg to be played April 16, 2009

 Firooz Sofeh Promoted to the Super League.

First leg

Return leg

See also 
 2008–09 Iranian Futsal Super League
 2008–09 Persian Gulf Cup
 2008–09 Azadegan League
 2008–09 Iran Football's 2nd Division
 2008–09 Iran Football's 3rd Division
 2008–09 Hazfi Cup
 Iranian Super Cup

References

External links 
  I.R. Iran Football Federation

Iran Futsal's 1st Division seasons
2008–09 in Iranian futsal leagues